Barbara Webster  is an Indian athlete. She won Bronze medals in Shot Put and Javelin in the 1951 Asian Games. Webster, like several of the Indian women's team, was an Anglo-Indian from Bombay.

References

Athletes (track and field) at the 1951 Asian Games
Indian female athletes
Asian Games bronze medalists for India
Asian Games medalists in athletics (track and field)
Medalists at the 1951 Asian Games